Cydia millenniana, the larch gall moth, is a moth of the family Tortricidae which galls larch (Larix spp). It is found from Europe to Russia and the Korean Peninsula.

This species is often confused with Cydia zebeana, which makes it difficult to be sure about the data published on the biology of both species. According to Whitebread (1975) and Booij and Diakonoff (1983), larvae of Cydia milleniana form galls, while larvae of Cydia zebeana do not.
 
The wingspan is 13–18 mm. Adults are on wing in June and July or May and June.

The larvae feed on Larix species. The larvae mine under the bark and cannot be detected, but gradually develop a resinous gall. Bark wounds, caused by the feeding of the larvae, are penetration sites for spores of the larch cancer Lachnellulla willkommii.

References

Gallery

External links
 Eurasian Tortricidae

Grapholitini
Gall-inducing insects
Moths described in 1967
Moths of Asia
Moths of Europe
Moths of Korea